This is a list of local government areas of The Gambia by Human Development Index as of 2023 with data for the year 2021.

References 

Gambia
Gambia
Local government areas  By Human Development Index